Shōwa Station may refer to:

Shōwa Station (Kanagawa), a train station in Kawasaki, Kanagawa, Japan
Showa Station (Antarctica), an Antarctic research station